Sojaprotein (full legal name: Sojaprotein a.d. za preradu soje Bečej) is a Serbian agribusiness company that produces soy-based products. It is headquartered in Bečej, Serbia. It is majority owned by Victoria Group. Sojaprotein processes exclusively non-GMO soybeans.

History
Founded on 22 June 1977, Sojaprotein started regular production six years later, in 1983. The company was privatised in 2002, and became a subsidiary of Serbian Victoria Group. Since then, Sojaprotein increased the capacity of the production; total revenue increased from 54 million euros in 2002, to 133 million euros in 2012.

On 17 March 2004, it was admitted to the free market of the Belgrade Stock Exchange.

Market and financial data
As of 22 March 2019, Sojaprotein has a market capitalization of 20.82 million euros.

See also
 Agriculture in Serbia

References

External links
 

1977 establishments in Serbia
Agriculture companies of Serbia
Companies based in Bečej
Food and drink companies established in 1977
Serbian brands
Soy products